Powerco is the second-largest gas and largest electricity distributor in New Zealand. It is one of only two companies to distribute both electricity and natural gas through their network (the other being Vector Limited). Its network delivers electricity and gas to households around the North Island from the national electricity transmission network Transpower and the natural gas transmission system owned and operated by Vector Limited.

Powerco arose from the energy reforms in New Zealand in the 1990s. It can trace its history back to a number of local power boards and gas companies that operated throughout the North Island. The company is currently owned by Australian companies, including Queensland Investment Corporation and AMP Limited.

Business
The New Zealand electricity reforms of the 1980s split the electricity industry broadly into four sections - generators, transmitters, distributors and retailers. Six main generator businesses (Contact Energy, Genesis Energy, Mercury Energy, Meridian Energy, Trustpower and Nova Energy) generate electricity and supply it to New Zealand's national grid, operated by Transpower. Transpower transmits high-voltage electricity to grid exit points (or substations) around New Zealand for transmission to households and businesses. The local distribution network (mostly consisting of underground wires and/or overhead wires) that transmit electricity to end-users like households and businesses are owned and operated by local distribution companies, mostly regionally based.

Powerco is a distributor whose business is completely separate from generation, national transmission and retail (selling delivered electricity to end-users). It operates a 30,000 km local electricity distribution network supplying 320,000 households, industries and businesses from Transpower's national grid and a 6,000 km natural gas distribution network supplying 102,000 households, industries and businesses from Vector's transmission system.

Its electricity network currently supplies the following regions: 
 Tauranga and the Western Bay of Plenty District
 Thames-Coromandel, Hauraki, Matamata-Piako and South Waikato Districts
 Taranaki Region
 Wanganui and Rangitikei Districts
 Palmerston North City and Manawatu District
 Southern Tararua District (south of and including Mangatainoka)
 Wairarapa

Powerco's natural gas distribution network covers:
 Taranaki
 Manawatu
 Palmerston North
 Horowhenua District
Hawke's Bay Region
 Hutt Valley
 Porirua
 Wellington City

Key dates 
 April 1993 - New Plymouth Energy (the electricity division of the New Plymouth District Council) merges with Taranaki Electricity (former Taranaki Electric Power Board) to become Taranaki Energy Limited.
 1994 - Taranaki Energy acquired the Hawera Gas Company.
 October 1995 - Taranaki Energy Limited merges with Wanganui-based Powerco (the former Wanganui Electric Power Board) to become PowerCo Limited.
 September 1997 - Powerco acquires Hawera based Egmont Electricity.
 April 1998 - Government pass Electricity Industry Reform Act. PowerCo decided to become a "network business" (or lines company), and the following changes are made:
 Electricity Retail Business (customer base) sold to Genesis Power
 Gas Retail Business sold to Natural Gas Corporation
 Natural Gas Corporation's Taranaki gas networks sold to Powerco
 Powerco's five hydro power stations sold to TrustPower
 Powerco purchases Wairarapa Electricity's network business (formerly part of the Wairarapa Electric Power Board)
 August 2000 - Powerco merged with CentralPower (itself formed by the merger of CentralPower (for former Manawatu-Oroua Power Board) and ElectroPower, the former electricity division of Palmerston North City Council).
 June 2001 - Powerco purchases the Hutt Valley and Porirua gas networks from AGL.
 February 2002 - Powerco purchases the Electricity Assets of United Networks Limited in Tauranga, Eastern and Southern Waikato, Thames and Coromandel, plus gas networks in Wellington, Horowhenua, Manawatu and Hawke's Bay.
 2004 - Powerco purchased Siemens Energy Services' Tauranga based contracting division
 November 2005 - Powerco sold its New Zealand field services contracting business to Tenix Alliance
 2008 - Divestment of Powerco Australia Group (Tasmania gas distribution) to Babcock & Brown Infrastructure

Electricity network statistics

Natural gas network statistics

References

External links

Electric power distribution network operators in New Zealand
Oil and gas companies of New Zealand
Energy companies established in 1999
New Zealand companies established in 1999